Lanny Lee Larason, known professionally as Tom Larson, is a retired Boston sportscaster and television host. He is currently  years old.

Early years
Larason grew up in Webster Groves, Missouri, where one of his friends was another future sportscaster, Skip Caray. He began his broadcasting career in 1960 as a junior at Westminster College. After college, Larason worked in Bloomington, Illinois, Peoria, Illinois, and Lansing, Michigan.

Career in Boston
In 1969, he was hired by WSBK-TV general manager Bill Flynn, who was looking for someone with a background in sports who could also host a public affairs talk show. Upon moving to Boston, Larason adopted the name "Tom Larson". During his tenure at WSBK, Larson hosted a daily talk show, hosted the post-game shows for the Boston Bruins and the Boston Red Sox, and served as the station's public affairs director. In 1985, Larson was replaced on Bruins games by Sean McDonough.

From 1981 to 1988, Tom was also the sports director at WHDH radio, doing sports reports during Jess Cain's morning show. In 1983, he was recognized as the best TV sportscaster in Boston, by Boston magazine.

In 1986, Larson joined the New England Sports Network, where he served as the studio host for Red Sox and Bruins games, wrote, produced, and reported for Front Row and a number of special presentations, and was a play-by-play announcer for college and high school sports.

Larson retired from broadcasting in 2007, and as of 2011 resides in Norwell, Massachusetts. In 1981, Larson had promised to shave his beard if the Bruins won the Stanley Cup; he shaved his beard 30 years later, after the Bruins defeated the Vancouver Canucks the 2011 Stanley Cup Finals.

References

Further reading

External links
 
 
 
 

Place of birth missing (living people)
Year of birth missing (living people)
Living people
Television anchors from Boston
Sports in Boston
Boston Bruins announcers
Boston Red Sox announcers
College football announcers
People from Norwell, Massachusetts
People from Webster Groves, Missouri
Westminster College (Missouri) alumni